The northern smooth-tailed treeshrew (Dendrogale murina) is a species of treeshrew in the family Tupaiidae found in Cambodia, Thailand, and Vietnam. Their diet primarily consists of invertebrates but rarely includes fruits and plants.

References

Further reading 
Endo et al. (July 1999) Functional morphology of the locomotor system in the northern smooth-tailed tree shrew (Dendrogale murina). Annals of Anatomy. Vol. 181, Number 4. pp. 397–402
Olson et al. (2005) Intraordinal phylogenetics of treeshrews (Mammalia: Scandentia)based on evidence from the mitochondrial 12S rRNA gene. Molecular Phylogenetics and Evolution. Vol. 35. pp. 656–673.
Olson et al. (March 2004) Phylogenetic Relationships Among Treeshrews (Scandentia): A Review and Critique of the Morphological Evidence. Journal of Mammalian Evolution. Vol. 11, Number 1. pp. 49–71.
Shchipanov, N. A.; A. A. Kalinin. (October 2006) Distribution of small mammals in three layers of south Vietnam rainforest. Doklady Biological Sciences. Vol. 410, Number 1. pp. 387–390.
Timmins et al. (September 2003) Distribution, status and ecology of the mainland slender-tailed treeshrew Dendrogale murina. Mammal Review. Vol. 33, Issue 3–4. pp 272–283.

Treeshrews
Mammals described in 1843
Taxonomy articles created by Polbot
Taxa named by Hermann Schlegel
Taxa named by Salomon Müller